Suzanne Arruda is the author of the Jade del Cameron mystery series, which follows the protagonist through her adventures on safari in Africa. She has also written some children's and young adult titles as well as writing for newspapers and magazines including Oasis, Pockets, Cricket, Boys' Life, Christian Science Monitor, and Her Voice. She is a part-time instructor at Pittsburg State University in Pittsburg, Kansas.

Selected works
Jade del Cameron Mystery from Penguin Books
 Mark of the Lion (2006) . According to WorldCat, the book is in 1137 libraries 
 Stalking Ivory (2007)  According to WorldCat, the book is in 836 libraries 
 The Serpent's Daughter (2008) 
 The Leopard's Prey (2009) 
 Treasure of the Golden Cheetah (2009) 
 The Crocodile's Last Embrace (2010) 
 Devil Dance (2015) 

Children and young adult titles
 A Stocking for Jesus, Pauline Books and Media, (2005)  
 The Girl He Left Behind, Avisson Press, (2004) 
 Freedom's Martyr, Avisson Press, (2003) 
 From Kansas to Cannibals, Avisson Press, (2001) 
 A Field Guide to the Metric System [or] How to Survive in the Wilderness of Numbers, PITSCO/Lego-Dacta, (1994)

References

External links
 Author's page at the publisher's website

American women writers
Living people
Year of birth missing (living people)
21st-century American women